Sleepwalking Land is a 2007 film based on the eponymous novel by Mia Couto. The film took its director Teresa Prata seven years to complete.

Synopsis 
In Mozambique, the civil war causes devastation among the population. Amongst this chaos, young Muidinga dreams of finding his family. One day, he finds a diary on a lifeless body in a gunned-down bus; it speaks of a woman searching for her son. Convinced that he's the missing son, Muidinga decides to find her. On his journey he's accompanied by an old man, Tuahir, always ready to tell a tale. Their journey is a battle, and turns them into somnambulists in a country devastated by war.

Awards 
 FIPRESCI Award for Best Film, International Film Festival of Kerala (India), 2007.
 Best Director, Pune International Film Festival (India).
 Famafest (Portugal)
 Festival Cinema Africano, Asi, America Latina de Milano (Italia)
 Festival Indie Lisboa (Portugal)

References

External links

 

2007 films
German drama films
Mozambican drama films
Portuguese drama films
2000s German films